Tata Technologies Limited is a company in the Tata Group that provides services in engineering and design, product lifecycle management, manufacturing, product development, and IT service management to automotive and aerospace original equipment manufacturers and their suppliers. It is a subsidiary of Tata Motors. The company is active in North America, Europe, the Middle East and the Asia Pacific region.

History
Tata Technologies was founded in 1989 and acquired INCAT, a European-based company, in 2005. Tata Technologies has headquarters in Pune and regional headquarters in the United States (Detroit, Michigan), ThaneOne Corporate Business IT Park, Thane and the UK (Warwick). The company operates in 25 countries, and has a combined global work force of more than 11,000 employees, including around 4,000 professionals worldwide. It is 15th Largest IT company in the Fortune India Infotech Industry ranking.

INCAT International, a UK-and US-based automotive and aerospaceputer engineering company, was established in 1989 and was acquired by Tata Technologies Inc in August 2005 for £53.4 million.

References

External links
 

Jamshedpur
Tata Group subsidiaries
Engineering companies of India
Manufacturing companies based in Pune
Manufacturing companies established in 1989
1989 establishments in Maharashtra
Indian companies established in 1989